Tapirus webbi is an extinct species of tapir that once lived in North America during the Late Miocene era.

References 

Prehistoric tapirs
Prehistoric mammals of North America